The Columbia Public Library is the public library of Columbia, Missouri, and was established as a tax-funded library in 1922. It is the headquarters of the Daniel Boone Regional Library system (DBRL), which serves Columbia and the surrounding areas.

The library was demolished and reconstructed at its current location on Garth and Broadway in 2002. The Columbia Library District merged with the Boone County Library District in 2017. In 2021, Columbia Public Library had 230,299 visits and a circulation of 1,086,818.

Daniel Boone Regional Library 

The Daniel Boone Regional Library (DBRL) system was established in 1959 as a joining of the Boone, Howard, and Callaway county libraries with the Columbia Public Library.

The Daniel Boone Regional Library system has the following branches:

 Columbia Public Library - 100 W. Broadway, Columbia, MO 65203
 Callaway County Public Library - 710 Court St., Fulton, MO 65251
 Holts Summit Public Library - 188 W. Simon Blvd., Holts Summit, MO 65043
 Southern Boone County Public Library - 109 N. Main St., Ashland, MO 65010
The system also has three bookmobiles. The largest bookmobile regularly stops in Auxvasse, Hallsville, Harrisburg, Rocheport, and Sturgeon.

Daniel Boone Regional Library Workers United 
In May 2022, DBRL employees voted 101 – 55 to form Daniel Boone Regional Library Workers United (DBRLWU), AFSCME Local 3311, AFSCME Council 63. This is the first active library workers' union in Missouri. Contract negotiations began October 14, 2022.

Notes

Buildings and structures in Columbia, Missouri
Public libraries in Missouri
Libraries in Columbia, Missouri
Tourist attractions in Columbia, Missouri
1959 establishments in Missouri
Library buildings completed in 1959
Library buildings completed in 2002